Gemma Mengual Civil (born 12 April 1977 in Barcelona, Catalonia, Spain) is a Spanish synchronised swimmer. She has competed at the 2000, 2004 and 2008 Summer Olympics. On 15 February  2012 she announced her retirement. After retiring she became involved with coaching the national synchronised swimming team. However in June 2015 Mengual announced that she would return to competition with the aim of competing at the 2015 World Aquatics Championships in Kazan, Russia, in the mixed duet with Pau Ribas, whom she had previously coached. Although she had previously indicated that she would not compete beyond the World Championships, in September of that year she confirmed via social media that she would compete in the duet in the 2016 Summer Olympics with Ona Carbonell.

During the 2020 Olympic Games (celebrated in 2021 due to COVID) she collaborated in the broadcast for the swimming-pool and floor events giving technical insight and expert opinion on the Olympian sport women.

Medals 
 2003 World Aquatics Championships – Bronze at Solo and Duet
 2005 World Aquatics Championships – Bronze at Solo and Team; Silver at Duet
 2006 European Aquatics Championships – Silver at Solo and Duet Free Routine
 Synchronized Swimming at the 2007 World Aquatics Championships – Silver at the Solo Technical Routine and bronze at the Solo Free Routine
 2008 European Aquatics Championships – Golds in all events.
 2008 Summer Olympics – Silver in Duet and Team.

References

External links
Golden Heart Award 2003 granted by Spanish Heart Foundation

Spanish synchronized swimmers
Synchronized swimmers at the 2000 Summer Olympics
Synchronized swimmers at the 2004 Summer Olympics
Synchronized swimmers at the 2008 Summer Olympics
Synchronized swimmers at the 2016 Summer Olympics
Olympic synchronized swimmers of Spain
Olympic silver medalists for Spain
1977 births
Living people
Swimmers from Barcelona
Olympic medalists in synchronized swimming
Medalists at the 2008 Summer Olympics
World Aquatics Championships medalists in synchronised swimming
Synchronized swimmers at the 2009 World Aquatics Championships
Synchronized swimmers at the 2007 World Aquatics Championships
Synchronized swimmers at the 2005 World Aquatics Championships
Synchronized swimmers at the 2003 World Aquatics Championships
Synchronized swimmers at the 2015 World Aquatics Championships